Ghanashyam Hemlata Vidya Mandir (GHVM) school is a senior secondary English-Medium school located in Puri, Odisha. Two G.H.V.M campuses are present, one in the Jharsuguda District of Odisha, and the other in Puri, Konark.

G.H.V.M is a progressive co-educational English medium school named after its founder-cum-chairman Ghanashyam Jena and his wife Hemalata Devi. Financial support came from to the founder, the FCI workers’ union, the petroleum products handlers and Careers Employees Union. This school is one of the 21,405 C.B.S.E affiliated schools in India.

See also
 Ghanashyama Hemalata Institute of Technology and Management
Ghanashyam Hemlata Vidya Mandir, Jharsuguda

References

External links 
GHVM Cuttack
GHVM Jharsuguda

Jharsuguda district
High schools and secondary schools in Odisha
1995 establishments in Orissa
Educational institutions established in 1995